Embutramide (INN, USAN, BAN) (brand name Embutane) is a potent opioid analgesic and sedative drug that is structurally related to methadone. It was developed by Hoechst A.G. in 1958 and was investigated as a general anesthetic agent, but was found to have a very narrow therapeutic window, with a 50 mg/kg dose producing effective sedation and a 75 mg/kg dose being fatal. Along with strong sedative effects, embutramide also produces respiratory depression and ventricular arrhythmia. Because of these properties, it was never adopted for medical use as an anesthetic as it was considered too dangerous for this purpose. Instead it is used for euthanasia in veterinary medicine, mainly for the euthanization of dogs.

Embutramide is formulated as a combination product under the brand name Tributame, which also contains chloroquine and lidocaine.

Embutramide is used for euthanasia of a range of different animals, mainly small animals kept as pets rather than large farm animals. It may cause significant pain to the animal being euthanized, and so may be less humane than older drugs used for this purpose such as pentobarbital; however, it may have less abuse potential than barbiturates especially in the Tributame combination formulation, and so is less likely to be diverted for recreational abuse. Embutramide has however been reported to be used for suicide by people with access to the drug, and was added to the list of Schedule III drugs in the US in 2006, as a Non-Narcotic with ACSCN 2020, which classifies it with depressants such as benzodiazepines, barbiturates, and other sedative-hypnotics.

Synthesis

Alkylation of (3-Methoxyphenyl)acetonitrile [19924-43-7] (1) with bromoethane gives 2-Ethyl-2-(3-methoxyphenyl)-butanenitrile [40692-21-5] (2). Sodium borohydride is used to reduce the nitrile group to give 2-ethyl-2-(3-methoxyphenyl)butan-1-amine [93309-48-9] (3'). Amide formation via reaction with gamma-butyrolactone completed the synthesis of embutramide (4).

References 

Anesthetics
Analgesics
Hypnotics
Sedatives
Phenol ethers
Carboxamides
Primary alcohols
Opioids